Gary Hershberger (born April 5, 1964) is an American actor and screenwriter. He is best known for his television roles as Mike Nelson in Twin Peaks (1989–1991; 2017) and Matthew Gilardi on Six Feet Under (2001–2002).

Early life and education 
Hershberger was born in Inglewood, California. From 1982 to 1986, he studied history and communication at the University of California, Los Angeles.

Career

Acting 
He is probably best known for Twin Peaks, appearing the 1990 original series on ABC and the 2017 revival on Showtime, Twin Peaks: The Return, along with the movie Twin Peaks: Fire Walk With Me (and Twin Peaks: The Missing Pieces).

Feature film roles include a mix of starring and supporting roles in Paradise Motel, My Man Adam, Free Ride, Beverly Hills Madam, Burglar, The Siege of Firebase Gloria, The Heroes of Desert Storm, Forever Love, Deep Core, Sneakers, Faith, Hope & Love, One Man's Hero, and the IMAX documentary Magnificent Desolation: Walking on the Moon 3D. TV movie roles include Into the Homeland, Perry Mason: The Case of the Avenging Ace, The Love She Sought, and The Christmas Pageant.

Hershberger has appeared in episodes of Grey's Anatomy, The West Wing, Murder, She Wrote, Columbo, The OC, JAG, Knight Rider, Highway to Heaven, China Beach, and the pilot episode of The Whispers.

Screenwriting and the Actor's Director Workshop 
He is a screenwriter and co-wrote the TV movie Python. He wrote the upcoming movie Late in the Season, which will also be his directorial debut. He won a PAGE International Screenwriting Award, and he was a finalist for other screenwriting awards.

He and his Twin Peaks co-star Sheryl Lee co-founded the Actor's Director Workshop. They have taught at the University of Southern California, UCLA, Pepperdine, and Loyola Marymount University.

His production company is called Deer Mountain Productions.

Personal life 
He is married with four children.

Filmography

Film

Television

Screenwriting

References

External links 
 

1964 births
Living people
American male film actors
American male television actors
University of California, Los Angeles alumni
Male actors from Inglewood, California